Warnbro is an electoral district of the Legislative Assembly in the Australian state of Western Australia.

The district is located in the outer south-western suburbs of Perth.

Politically, Warnbro is a safe Labor seat. At its creation, the district was calculated to have a Labor Party majority of 61.2% to 38.8% versus the Liberal Party.

History
Warnbro was first created for the 2008 state election. It was essentially a truncation of the abolished district of Peel. All of Warnbro was previously covered by Peel, whilst Peel's northernmost suburbs became part of the new district of Kwinana.

Warnbro was won by Labor MP Paul Papalia, who was previously the member for Peel.

Geography
Warnbro is a coastal electorate situated in the south-western corner of the Metropolitan Region Scheme. It takes in the suburbs of Warnbro,  Port Kennedy,  Secret Harbour,  Golden Bay,  Karnup,  Singleton, as well as parts of Baldivis and Waikiki.

Members for Warnbro

Election results

References

External links
 

Electoral districts of Western Australia